Dentistyla asperrima is a species of sea snail, a marine gastropod mollusk in the family Chilodontidae.

Description
The size of the shell varies between 4 mm and 8.5 mm. There is a small tooth on the columella.

Distribution
This species occurs in the Caribbean Sea, the Gulf of Mexico and the Lesser Antilles.

References

 Rosenberg, G., F. Moretzsohn, and E. F. García. 2009. Gastropoda (Mollusca) of the Gulf of Mexico, Pp. 579–699 in Felder, D.L. and D.K. Camp (eds.), Gulf of Mexico–Origins, Waters, and Biota. Biodiversity. Texas A&M Press, College Station, Texas.
 Turgeon, D.D., et al. 1998. Common and scientific names of aquatic invertebrates of the United States and Canada. American Fisheries Society Special Publication 26-page(s): 60

External links
 Gasqtropods.com: Dentistyla asperrima

asperrima
Gastropods described in 1881